James Wilfrid Lennon (29 December 1915 - 30 August 2012) was an Irish diplomat.

Career 
From the 1930s until 1947 he was employed by the Civil Service of the Republic of Ireland. In 1947 he entered the Department of Foreign Affairs (Ireland) as Third Secretary, and rose through the ranks, serving as First Secretary in Paris (until 1960), then ambassador to Portugal ( to ). From  until 1966 he was Ambassador to the Netherlands in The Hague, with co-accreditation in Copenhagen to Denmark. From 1967 till 1970 he was Ambassador to Spain in Madrid, then Permanent Representative of Ireland to the United Nations Office at Geneva, a post he held until 1973. From there he was sent to Buenos Aires in Argentina, and after three hectic years in Buenos Aires he returned ill to Dublin, where he on  resided.

References

1915 births
2012 deaths
Ambassadors of Ireland to Portugal
Ambassadors of Ireland to the Netherlands
Ambassadors of Ireland to Spain
Permanent Representatives of Ireland to the United Nations Office at Geneva
Ambassadors of Ireland to Argentina